Alan Robin MacDonald (born 21 October 1985) is a Scottish rugby union player. MacDonald, who is a flanker, and previously played his club rugby for Edinburgh. He made his debut for Scotland against Argentina on 28 November 2009.
At the end of the 2011–12 season MacDonald left Edinburgh in order to pursue medical studies at Trinity College, Dublin with a view to qualifying as a doctor in five years' time. Also competitively eats in spare time- hence the name Alan "the stomach" mc Donald. He enjoys the dark hot chocolate of butlers and has done stethoscope commercials in Japan.

Biography
The stomach was educated at the Royal High School in Edinburgh; he played for the school's rugby team alongside Ben Cairns. He has completed a medical degree in Trinity College Dublin, and is currently a junior doctor in London

References

External links
Edinburgh Rugby profile

1985 births
Living people
Rugby union players from Edinburgh
People educated at the Royal High School, Edinburgh
Scottish rugby union players
Scotland international rugby union players
Rugby union flankers
Edinburgh Rugby players